The Asia Rugby Sevens Series is an annual series of regional rugby sevens tournaments run by Asia Rugby featuring national sevens teams. It has been held regularly since 2009 to determine Asia's best men's national team in the sport of rugby sevens.

History
The first season of the competition began in 2009 with two events happening in Shanghai and Borneo. In the first season, Japan took out the trophy after taking out the Borneo Sevens and finishing runner up in Shanghai.

Tournaments
Tournaments that have featured as ranking events in the Asian Sevens Series include:

Notes:
 Italics denotes tournaments that are non-ranking events not counting towards the annual series championship.

 The inaugural 2009 series also included non-ranking events at Kish Island in Iran, Subic in the Philippines, and Brunei.

 It was originally planned to use the 2015 Asian Sevens Series as the qualifier for the 2016 Olympics but the series clashed with the 2015 Rugby World Cup so a separate Asian Olympic qualifying tournament was held with the final stage hosted in Hong Kong.

 The 2020 series was cancelled before any events were held, due to impacts of the COVID-19 pandemic.

 Incheon, Huizhou and Colombo were originally scheduled as legs of the 2021 series. Due to impacts of the COVID-19 pandemic, all three of those events were cancelled and replaced – initially by two events planned for Dubai, but eventually by just one event in Dubai.

Honours
By year

Series titles

See also
 Asia Rugby Women's Sevens Series

References

External links
Asia Rugby

 
Rugby sevens competitions in Asia
Recurring sporting events established in 2009
2009 establishments in Asia
Asian championships